Espedal is a valley and hamlet in the municipality of Fjaler in Vestland county, Norway. The area is owned by the Espedal family.

Espedal is featured in the 2007 documentary film True Norwegian Black Metal which focused on some aspects of the life of black metal performer Kristian "Gaahl" Espedal.  Espedal has been popularly mistaken for a village, a misconception perpetuated by the aforementioned documentary.

Notable residents
 Kristian Eivind Espedal (also known as: Gaahl) – black metal vocalist for the bands God Seed and Trelldom, and a former black metal vocalist for Gorgoroth

References

Populated places in Vestland
Fjaler